Obere Warnow is a municipality in the Ludwigslust-Parchim district, in Mecklenburg-Vorpommern, Germany. It was formed on 1 January 2012 by the merger of the former municipalities Grebbin and Herzberg. It takes its name from the river Warnow, that has its source near Grebbin.

References

Ludwigslust-Parchim